Sea Sprite may refer to:

Sprite (creature), a broad term referring to a number of supernatural legendary creatures
Sea Sprite Sailing Yachts, a series of sail boats
Kaman SH-2 Seasprite, a series of helicopters
Purcell Sea Sprite, an experimental homebuilt glider aircraft